The following lists events that happened during 1984 in Cape Verde.

Incumbents
President: Aristides Pereira
Prime Minister: Pedro Pires

Events
February 17: the national airport authority, Aeroportos e Segurança Aérea, was established

Arts and entertainment
August: first edition of the annual Festival de Baía das Gatas, on the island of São Vicenteo

Sports
FC Derby won the Cape Verdean Football Championship

Births
February 6: Dani Gomes Monteiro, footballer
October 27: Alison Brito, footballer

References

 
Years of the 20th century in Cape Verde
1980s in Cape Verde
Cape Verde
Cape Verde